Fatimah Abdullah al Turki (فاطمة عبد الله التركي, born 1953) is a Qatari writer, who has written under the pseudonym Umm Aktham( أمّاأكثم ) or Sarah(سارة) in the 1970s.

Styles and political views
She frequented attacks on the arabic society on the suffering of women under arabian regimes, but did not aspire a western liberal model.

Works
Winter of the Eskimo (1978, شتاء الاسكيمو)
 'Yawmiyat fi-l-manfa(يوميات في المنفى,Memoirs in exile)', in Layla Salih, ed., Adab al-mar ah fi al-Jazirah wa al-Khalij al-Arabi(Women's literature at the Arabian peninsula and Arabian gulf), 1983, pp. 266–74

References

External link
Archive of her work in arabic

1953 births
Living people
20th-century Arabic writers
Qatari short story writers
Qatari women writers
20th-century pseudonymous writers
Pseudonymous women writers